Eucalyptus sheathiana, commonly known as ribbon-barked gum or ribbon-barked mallee, is a species of tree or a mallee that is endemic to Western Australia. It has smooth bark that is shed in long ribbons, lance-shaped adult leaves, flower buds in groups of seven, creamy white flowers and conical to cup-shaped fruit.

Description
It has smooth, greyish bark that is shed in long ribbons. Flowering occurs from January to April and the flowers are creamy white.

Taxonomy and naming
Eucalyptus sheathiana was first formally described in 1916 by Joseph Maiden from material collected in Kings Park by Jeremiah Sheath (1850–1915), in turn, from seed collected from the "Eastern Gold Fields near the South Australian border". The specific epithet (sheathiana) honour the collector of the type specimens.

Distribution and habitat
This eucalypt is found on plains in the southern wheatbelt between Wongan Hills, Nyabing and Lake King, and in nearby parts of the Goldfields-Esperance region. It grows in shrubland on sandy lateritic soils.

Conservation status
This eucalypt is classified as "not threatened" by the Western Australian Government Department of Parks and Wildlife.

See also
List of Eucalyptus species

References

Eucalypts of Western Australia
Trees of Australia
sheathiana
Myrtales of Australia
Plants described in 1916
Mallees (habit)
Taxa named by Joseph Maiden